Pidan doufu 皮蛋豆腐 is a cold tofu dish consisting of slices of silken tofu topped with diced thousand-year-old eggs (皮蛋 or 松花蛋), minced garlic and spring onion, and a splash of soy sauce and Chinese vinegar.

See also

 List of tofu dishes

References

External links
 The Grub Files: Cooking with Camissonia

Tofu dishes